HWL could refer to:

 Hartwell railway station, Melbourne, Australia; station code HWL.
 Hawaii Winter League baseball
 Horst-Wessel-Lied
 Howland Island; ITU letter code HWL.
 Hutchison Whampoa Ltd.
 High Water Line